Elektra/Musician was a jazz record label founded as a subsidiary of Elektra Records in 1982. The label was headed by Bruce Lundvall and released its first batch of albums on February 12, 1982. The label ceased when Lundvall left Elektra to start EMI's Manhattan Records in 1984. Elektra unsuccessfully attempted to revive the Elektra/Musician label in the late 1980s with acts such as the Gipsy Kings, but the label was eventually absorbed by Nonesuch Records, which also absorbed the label's earlier iteration in 1984.

Elektra/Musician released albums by Joe Albany, Bill Evans, Dexter Gordon, Charles Lloyd, Bobby McFerrin, Woody Shaw, Sphere, Steps Ahead, and McCoy Tyner.

Selected discography

Notes

References

External links
Discogs

American record labels
Jazz record labels
Rock record labels
Elektra Records
 
Nonesuch Records
Record labels established in 1982
1982 establishments in the United States